Almirante Brown is a partido of the Buenos Aires Province, Argentina, located at the south of the Gran Buenos Aires urban area, at coordinates .

It has an area of 129.33 km2 (49.9 sq mi) and 555,731 inhabitants, and its capital is Adrogué.

Name
The partido is named after Irish born General William Brown who led the Argentine navy in the Argentine War of Independence and helped Argentina gain her independence from the Spanish Empire.

Cities
Adrogué 
Burzaco
Claypole
Don Orione
Rafael Calzada
Glew
Longchamps
Malvinas Argentinas
José Marmol
Ministro Rivadavia
San Francisco de Asís
San José
San Francisco Solano

References

External links

 
 Ministry of the Interior statistics
 Almirante Brown Police Department

 
Partidos of Buenos Aires Province
1875 establishments in Argentina